The National Social Security Fund is a supplementary fund of the People's Republic of China which is used for social security. The fund was managed by National Council for Social Security Fund.

History
On 1 August 2000, the Central Committee of CPC and the State Council decided to establish National Social Security Fund (NSSF), and set up the National Council for Social Security Fund (SSF) for managing and operating the NSSF's assets.
NSSF aims to be a solution to the problem of aging and serves as a strategic reserve fund accumulated by the central government to support future social security expenditures and other social security needs.

Investment policy and scope
Under relevant provisions of the Interim Management Measures on the Investments of the National Social Security Fund, the Interim Management Measures on the Overseas Investments of the National Social Security Fund, the NSSF are permitted to invest in the following products:

1. Domestic investments: bank deposits, treasury bonds, financial bonds, corporate bonds, securitized products, securities investment funds, stocks, industrial investments, industrial investment funds and trust investments.

2. Overseas investments: bank deposits, foreign treasury bonds, bonds of international financial organizations, bonds of foreign entities, foreign corporate bonds, overseas bonds issued by the Chinese government or Chinese enterprises, money market products such as banking drafts and large CDs, stocks, funds, derivative instruments such as swaps and futures, and such other investment products or instruments jointly approved by the Ministry of Treasury and the Ministry of Labor and Social Security.

Size of the fund and asset allocation
As of December 31, 2009, the total asset under management of the National Council for Social Security Fund (SSF) stood at RMB 776.5bn, among which RMB692.7bn are NSSF equity capital. Among different asset categories, fixed income took up 40.67%, domestic stocks 25.91%, global stocks 6.54%, equity assets 20.54%, cash equivalents 6.34%.

Departments
The NCSSF's departments include:
General Office
Finance and Accounting
Investment
Equity Management
Legal Compliance
Information and Research
Human Resources

References

External links
 List of Global Stock mandates received by foreign Asset Managers  

2000 establishments in China
Government agencies established in 2000
Government agencies of China
Organizations based in Beijing
Welfare in China
Social security in China